Much is the first album by Christian rock band Ten Shekel Shirt, released in 2001. The album was nominated for the 2002 Dove Award for Praise & Worship Album of the Year.

Track listing
"Meet With Me"
"Ocean"
"Sweet Embrace"
"Healer"
"Unashamed Love"
"Much"
"Peace With You"
"Come Away"
"House of Memories (Lindsay's Song)"
"Great"

2001 albums
Ten Shekel Shirt albums